Rhea Jo Perlman (born March 31, 1948) is an American actress. She played head-waitress Carla Tortelli in the sitcom Cheers (1982–1993). Over the course of 11 seasons, Perlman was nominated for ten Emmy Awards for Outstanding Supporting Actress — winning four times — and was nominated for a record seven Golden Globe Awards for Best Supporting Actress in a Television Series. She has also appeared in films, including Canadian Bacon (1995), Matilda (1996), The Sessions (2012), and Poms (2019).

Early life and family
Perlman was born on March 31, 1948, in Coney Island, Brooklyn, to Philip Perlman, a Polish immigrant who was a manager at a doll parts factory and Adele, a bookkeeper. She grew up in Bensonhurst in a Jewish family with additional roots in Russia. She has a sister, Heide, who is a television writer, story editor, and producer who worked on Cheers, Frasier and The Tracey Ullman Show. In the mid-1980s, her parents moved to Los Angeles, and her father became an extra on Cheers. His character became known by his real name, Phil, and he managed to get a few lines over the years as he appeared in more than 30 episodes. He created a second career as a character actor, appearing in several films and television shows, including Throw Momma from the Train, Hoffa, and Frasier.

She studied drama at Hunter College in New York, earning a Bachelor of Arts degree in 1968.

Career

Perlman began her acting career with a small role as an attendant in the off-off-Broadway play Dracula Sabbat, which ran from September 1970 to June 1971. In 1972, she played a bit role in the film Hot Dogs for Gauguin. That same year she appeared in Westbeth Playwrights Feminist Collective's production of Up – An Uppity Revue, along with her future husband, Danny DeVito.

One of her first notable parts was a recurring role on the television show Taxi as Zena, the sweet girlfriend of Louie De Palma (played by DeVito).

Following that, she had a role in a small play portraying a much tougher character.  Producers Glen and Les Charles saw her in that play, which led to her landing the role as wisecracking barmaid Carla Tortelli on their sitcom Cheers in 1982. The series struggled with ratings in its first season, but by the time it ended in 1993, it was one of the most popular and successful shows of all time, winning 20 Emmy awards out of 95 nominations.

Perlman won the Emmy Award for Outstanding Supporting Actress in a Comedy four times: in 1984, 1985, 1986 and 1989. Over her 11 seasons on Cheers, she was nominated for an Emmy every year but 1992, becoming the Cheers star to have the most wins and nominations. She was also nominated for a Golden Globe for Best Supporting Actress six times, more than anyone else in that category.  In 2011, CBS named Carla Tortelli as one of the greatest TV characters of all time.

In 1986, Perlman starred in an episode of Steven Spielberg's Amazing Stories titled "The Wedding Ring," which also starred DeVito as her character's husband.

In the 1990s, Perlman starred in several TV movies and motion pictures. In 1992, she starred in the made-for-TV-movie, To Grandmother's House We Go opposite Ashley Olsen and Mary-Kate Olsen, playing the wife of Jerry Van Dyke's character; the couple kidnapped the Olsen Twins' characters, hoping to cash in on ransom before Christmas. Other TV films in which she starred included the dramas A Place to Be Loved and In Spite of Love.

Perlman's motion picture roles included There Goes The Neighborhood (1992), Canadian Bacon (1995), Carpool (1996), Sunset Park (1996), and Matilda (1996). She had a cameo in the film 10 Items Or Less (2006), and also starred in the 2007 independent film Love Comes Lately.

In 1994, Perlman voiced 9-Eye in The Timekeeper, a Circle-Vision show at the Magic Kingdom in Tomorrowland. She later starred in the 1996 sitcom Pearl as the title character and was featured on the 2001 TV drama Kate Brasher. Among her notable guest appearances was on the fourth-season premiere of Becker, which starred Cheers co-star Ted Danson.

Perlman also appeared in a 2000 television film How to Marry a Billionaire: A Christmas Tale, in which she impersonated Jacqueline Kennedy. She also portrayed a therapist called Dr. Parella in the 2000 film Secret Cutting, which follows the story of a young girl named Dawn who self-injures. In 2007, Perlman appeared as Bertha in the West End of London in the comedy Boeing Boeing. In 2008, she starred in the Hallmark Channel original movie, The Christmas Choir, and appeared in Beethoven's Big Break in 2008 as Patricia Benji. In 2009, she appeared as Tanya's mother on the series Hung for Home Box Office Networks. In 2011, Perlman had a guest appearance as Mittens in one episode of Wilfred.

In 2009, Perlman and her daughter Lucy DeVito starred in the off-Broadway play Love, Loss, and What I Wore, adapted by Nora and Delia Ephron, at the Westside Theatre.

From 2014 to 2017, she starred in a recurring role on The Mindy Project as Danny's mother, Annette Castellano.

Writing
Perlman is the author of the illustrated children's book series Otto Undercover, whose six books to date (as of the middle of May 2012) are Born to Drive, Canyon Catastrophe, Water Balloon Doom, Toxic Taffy Takeover, The Brink of Ex-stink-tion, and Brain Freeze.

Personal life
 Perlman met Danny DeVito on January 17, 1971, when she went to see a friend in the single performance of the play The Shrinking Bride, which also featured DeVito.  They moved in together two weeks after meeting  and married on January 28, 1982. They have three children: Lucy Chet DeVito, Grace Fan DeVito, and Jacob Daniel DeVito. Perlman, who is Jewish, and DeVito, who was raised Catholic, raised their children celebrating the major holidays of both religions but did not give their children any religious identity. Perlman told the Los Angeles Times in 1998: "We do all the holidays to keep the traditions and the culture going, but I truly don't have a great feeling about any particular organized religion, and I don't think it's right to impose one on my kids. I feel like I'm bringing them up to be good people, and that's what it's about." In addition to their three children, the couple has one granddaughter.

The family resided in Beverly Hills, California, and they owned a vacation home in Interlaken, New Jersey that they frequented to get away from Los Angeles. Throughout their relationship, Perlman and DeVito have acted alongside each other several times, including in the TV show Taxi and the feature film Matilda.

Perlman and DeVito separated in October 2012. However, in March 2013, it was reported that they had reconciled. The couple later separated again for a second time in March 2017 on amicable terms. Although the two no longer live together, Perlman said she has no intention of divorcing DeVito. In 2019, Perlman told interviewer Andy Cohen that she and DeVito have become closer friends after their separation than they were in their final years as a couple.

Filmography

Film

Television

References

External links

 
 
 

1948 births
Living people
20th-century American actresses
21st-century American actresses
Actresses from New York City
American film actresses
American television actresses
American people of Polish-Jewish descent
American people of Russian-Jewish descent
American voice actresses
Hunter College alumni
Jewish American actresses
Lafayette High School (New York City) alumni
New York (state) Democrats
Outstanding Performance by a Supporting Actress in a Comedy Series Primetime Emmy Award winners
People from Coney Island
People from Interlaken, New Jersey
People from Monmouth County, New Jersey
People from Bensonhurst, Brooklyn
21st-century American Jews